Eleanor Elise Robson Belmont (13 December 1879 – 24 October 1979) was an English actress and prominent public figure in the United States. George Bernard Shaw wrote Major Barbara for her, but contractual problems prevented her from playing the role. Mrs. Belmont was involved in the Metropolitan Opera Association as the first woman on the board of directors, and she founded the Metropolitan Opera Guild.

Early life
Eleanor Elise Robson was born on 13 December 1879 in Wigan, Lancashire. She was the daughter of Madge Carr Cook and Charles Robson.  Her mother was an English-born American stage actress and as a young girl, Eleanor moved to the United States.  Her father disappeared or deserted her mother in 1880, and her mother remarried to Augustus Cook in 1891. Cooke later sued her for annulment of their marriage.

Career
Her stage career began at age 17 in San Francisco and she worked in stock companies from Honolulu to Milwaukee. In 1899, she was a member of the summer stock company at the Elitch Theatre—the original Summer stock theatre.

She made her New York debut in 1900 as Bonita, the ranchman's daughter in Augustus Thomas's Arizona.

Her ten-year career as a leading Broadway actress included top roles in such plays as Robert Browning's In a Balcony (1900), Shakespeare's Romeo and Juliet (1903) opposite Kyrle Bellew, Israel Zangwill's Merely Mary Ann (1903–04 and 1907), Oliver Goldsmith's She Stoops to Conquer (1905), Zangwill's Nurse Marjorie (1906), and Paul Armstrong's adaptation of Bret Harte's Salomy Jane (1907).

Philanthropy
In 1912, she started the Society for the Prevention of Useless Giving (SPUG) with Anne Tracy Morgan. Belmont joined the Metropolitan Opera's board of directors in 1933, founded the Metropolitan Opera Guild in 1935 and the National Council of the Metropolitan Opera in 1952. These organisations helped shape the multi-source public-private funding model used by US performing arts organisations in the ensuing decades

Personal life
Upon her marriage to August Belmont Jr. on 26 February 1910, Eleanor retired from the stage.  August and Eleanor were married for over fourteen years until his death on 10 December 1924. Belmont died in her sleep in New York City on 24 October 1979. She was 99 years old.

References

External links

 
 
 
 
 Eleanor Robson Belmont Papers 1851–1979 via Columbia University

1879 births
1979 deaths
People from Wigan
English stage actresses
English film actresses
Belmont family
Actresses from Lancashire
20th-century English actresses